The 1951–52 Panhellenic Championship was not held, due to increased obligations of the Greece national football team to qualify and participate in the Olympic Games, the Mediterranean Games but also for the Mediterranean Cup. Only the Athenian, Piraeus' and Macedonian championships were held, in which Panathinaikos, Olympiacos and Iraklis, respectively finished first.

Qualification round

Athens Football Clubs Association

 a.  AEK Athens did not show in the championship play-off match, so Panathinaikos was declared champion.
 b.  The Athenian Federation added 3 points to Panathinakos for the victory without a match in the championship play-off against AEK Athens.

Piraeus Football Clubs Association

 b.  3rd place ranking match: AE Nikaia–Atromitos Piraeus 5–3.
 c.  5th place ranking match: Proodeftiki–Panelefsiniakos 2–0.

Macedonia Football Clubs Association

Final round

Not played.

See also
Football at the 1951 Mediterranean Games
Football at the Mediterranean Games

References

External links
Rsssf, 1951–52 championship

Panhellenic Championship seasons
1951–52 in Greek football
Greek